Love Over and Over is the fifth album by Kate & Anna McGarrigle, released in 1982. Following this album, the McGarrigles did not release an album of new material until Heartbeats Accelerating in 1990. The album contains a French-Canadian version of Bob Seger's You'll Accomp'ny Me.

Track listing

Side One
"Move Over Moon" (Kate McGarrigle) – 3:11
"Sun, Son (Shining on the Water)" (Anna McGarrigle) – 4:03
"I Cried for Us" (Kate McGarrigle) – 3:23
"Love Over and Over" (Kate & Anna McGarrigle) – 4:07
"Star Cab Company" (Anna McGarrigle) – 3:30
"Tu vas m'accompagner" (Bob Seger; translated. by Anna McGarrigle) – 3:56

Side Two
"On My Way to Town" (Kate McGarrigle) – 2:17
"Jesus Lifeline" (Arranged by Anna McGarrigle) – 3:01
"Work Song" (Kate McGarrigle) – 3:49
"St. Valentines Day, 1978 (Black Heart)" (Anna McGarrigle) – 3:17
"Midnight Flight" (Kate McGarrigle) – 5:42

Bonus tracks
The 1997 Hannibal CD reissue contains two bonus tracks not found on the Polydor release:
 "A Place in Your Heart" (Kate & Anna McGarrigle, Pat Donaldson, Dane Lanken, Jane McGarrigle) – 3:07
 "Babies If I Didn't Have You" (Kate McGarrigle) – 3:34 (B-side on the single release of the title track "Love Over and Over")

Personnel
 Kate McGarrigle : Piano, banjo, accordion, guitar, vocals
 Anna McGarrigle : Piano, accordion, vocals 
 Alun Davies : Guitar
 Andrew Cowan : Guitar 
 Chaim Tannenbaum : Guitar, banjo, mandolin, vocals 
 Mark Knopfler - Guitar on "Love Over and Over"
 Scot Lang : Guitar, bass guitar 
 Pat Donaldson : Bass guitar
 Paul Samwell-Smith : Bass guitar
 Jane McGarrigle : Organ, vocals 
 Kenny Pearson : Piano, organ
 Gilles Losier : Piano
 Dane Lanken : Trumpet 
 Gerry Conway : Drums 
 Jean-Paul Robichaud : Drums, percussions
 Ted Jensen : Engineer at Sterling Sound, NYC - mastering

References

External links
 

1982 albums
Kate & Anna McGarrigle albums
Polydor Records albums